Nadine Tamara Bryan (born 18 December 1976) is a Jamaican international netball player. Bryan is a current member of the Jamaica national netball team, the Sunshine Girls. She debuted for the Sunshine Girls in 1997 and has gone on to play in every major netball tournament for Jamaica since. After several years as vice-captain of the Sunshine Girls, Bryan was temporarily promoted to captain at the end of 2009, after incumbent skipper Simone Forbes took a break from international netball.

Domestically, Bryan plays for Jamalco in the JNA Super League. As of 2009, she has received the MVP award for the league on four occasions. Bryan is an attacking midcourt player at international level, although has played a shooting role on occasion in domestic competition.

References

Jamaican netball players
Commonwealth Games bronze medallists for Jamaica
Netball players at the 1998 Commonwealth Games
Netball players at the 2002 Commonwealth Games
Netball players at the 2006 Commonwealth Games
Netball players at the 2010 Commonwealth Games
1976 births
Living people
Commonwealth Games medallists in netball
2003 World Netball Championships players
2007 World Netball Championships players
2011 World Netball Championships players
Medallists at the 2002 Commonwealth Games